Holy Cross Abbey (Mainistir na Croise Naofa) was a Cistercian monastery in Holycross near Thurles, County Tipperary, Ireland, situated on the River Suir. It takes its name from a relic of the True Cross or Holy Rood.

History
A supposed fragment of the True Cross was brought to Ireland by the Plantagenet Queen Isabella of Angoulême, around 1233. She was the widow of King John and bestowed the relic on the original Cistercian Monastery in Thurles founded in 1169 by King Donal O'Brien of Thomond, which she then rebuilt.

With time, Holy Cross Abbey and the sacred relic of the True Cross became a place of medieval pilgrimage, and with the Protestant Reformation, also a rallying-point for the dispossessed and victims of religious persecution. As a symbol and inspiration for the defence of the Catholic faith, resistance and the struggle for freedom, it drew a complaint by Sir Henry Sidney, Lord Lieutenant of Ireland, to Queen Elizabeth I in 1567.

The Annals of the Kingdom of Ireland recount that in 1601, Prince Hugh Roe O'Donnell, on his way to the Battle of Kinsale, true to his family arms and Constantinian motto (In Hoc Signo Vinces) and in anticipation of the battle to come at Kinsale, visited and venerated a relic of the True Cross on the Feast of St. Andrew, on 30 November 1601, at Holy Cross Abbey. At that period it was a rallying point for the defence of religious freedom and for Irish sovereignty. From there he sent an expedition to Ardfert, to win a quick victory and successfully recover the territory of his ally, Fitzmaurice, Lord of Kerry, who had lost it and his 9-year-old son to Sir Charles Wilmot. It was the last victory before the defeat at Kinsale.

The Holy Rood relic was last exposed for public veneration in 1632, and following the Cromwellian war, Holy Cross Abbey fell into ruins. Local people used the roofless ruins as a burial place after 1740. It became a scheduled national monument in 1880, "to be preserved and not used as a place of worship".

Special legislation in the Dáil on its 500th anniversary, 21 January 1969, enabled Holy Cross Abbey to be restored as a place of Catholic worship, exceptionally for a national monument. The Sacristan of St. Peter's Basilica in the Vatican provided an authenticated relic of the Holy Cross, and the emblem of the Jerusalem Cross, or Crusader Cross, has been restored for the Abbey.

Two crosses were stolen, including the cross containing the relics of the true cross, in a raid on the Abbey on 11 October 2011. A portable angle grinder, hammer and screwdriver were used by the masked raiders to remove the relics. In January 2012, the relics of the true cross were reported to have been retrieved.

Gallery

Transport
The Thurles to Clonmel via Cashel bus route serves Holycross. The nearest railway station is Thurles railway station approximately 6 km distant.

See also
 List of abbeys and priories in Ireland

References

External links
Holy Cross Abbey, Tipperary on Ireland's Hidden Gems
Discover Ireland page

Cistercian monasteries in the Republic of Ireland
National Monuments in County Tipperary
Religious buildings and structures in County Tipperary
Holycross